Adelaide United is an Australian professional association football club based in Adelaide, South Australia. The club was formed in 2003. They became the first southern member to participate in the A-League since 2005.

Managers
 Manager dates are sourced from WorldFootball.net
 Only first-team competitive matches are counted; Wins, losses and draws are results at the final whistle; the results of penalty shoot-outs are not counted.
 Statistics are complete up to and including the match played 11 March 2023.

Key
M = matches played; W = matches won; D = matches drawn; L = matches lost; GF = Goals for; GA = Goals against; Win % = percentage of total matches won

References

Adelaide United FC